Sciences Po Toulouse, or The Institut d'études politiques de Toulouse is one of the nine Institutes of Political Studies of France. Based in the center of Toulouse, France, next to the Université Toulouse 1 Capitole, this highly selective political science grande école was founded by a Decree in 1948 under the name of Institut d'études politiques de l'université de Toulouse. Since 2004 the courses have been 5 years long.

History

Four institutes of political studies (in Bordeaux, Lyon, Grenoble and Toulouse) were established in 1946 following an executive decree by General Charles de Gaulle. The institut d'études politiques de Toulouse is one of them as an autonomous body within Toulouse 1 University Capitole. Since 2008, the cooperation between the different institut d'études politiques has increased and its students can now leave their institute in order to apply nearly freely in another one, furthermore, the competitive written examination (for students selection) is co-organized with five other institutes, respectively in Aix-en-Provence, Lille, Lyon, Rennes and Strasbourg.

Directors
1948 - 1955: Paul Couzinet, university professor
1955 - 1980: Paul Ourliac, university professor in legal history
1980 - 1995: André Cabanis, university professor in legal history
1995 - 2000: Christian Hen, university professor in European public law
2000 - 2010: Laure Ortiz, university professor in public law
2010 - 2016: Philippe Raimbault, university professor in public law
July 4, 2016 - October 31: Christopher Charles, Lecturer in Public Law (provisional administrator)
2016 - 2021: Olivier Brossard, university professor in Economics
September 1, 2021: Eric Darras, university professor in political science

Organisation

Sciences Po institutes are Grandes Écoles, a French institution of higher education that is separate from, but parallel and connected to the main framework of the French public university system. Similar to the Ivy League in the United States, Oxbridge in the UK, and C9 League in China, Grandes Écoles are elite academic institutions that admit students through an extremely competitive process. Alums go on to occupy elite positions within government, administration, and corporate firms in France.

The institute is modeled on the former École Libre des Sciences Politiques, and as such, Sciences Po uses an interdisciplinary approach to education that provides student generalists with the high level of grounding in skills that they need in History, Law, Economic Sciences, Sociology, Political science and International relations, enriched by specialization in years 4 and 5, after a 3rd year either on a professional placement in France or overseas or alternatively studying at a foreign university.

Although these institutes are more expensive than public universities in France, Grandes Écoles typically have much smaller class sizes and student bodies, and many of their programs are taught in English. International internships, study abroad opportunities, and close ties with government and the corporate world are a hallmark of the Grandes Écoles. Many of the top ranked schools in Europe are members of the Conférence des Grandes Écoles (CGE), as are the Sciences Po institutions. Degrees from Sciences Po are accredited by the Conférence des Grandes Écoles and awarded by the Ministry of National Education (France).

Teaching

Like the other institutes of political studies, it provides students with general training in political sciences, law, sociology, economics, general knowledge, and history. Since 2004, Courses have been 5 years long. it main diploma is equivalent to a master's degree. Its specialty is national security.

Notable faculty
 Jacques Cantier, historian
 Jean-François Soulet, historian
 Patrick Champagne, sociologist
 Jean-Michel Ducomte,  lawyer
 Jean-Louis Loubet del Bayle, sociologist
 Laure Ortiz, director of the Institut d'études politiques de Toulouse between 2000 and 2010
 Robert Marconis, geographer

Notable alumni
Gérard Mestrallet, Chairman of the Board and CEO of GDF Suez
Sylvain Augier, journalist
Audrey Crespo-Mara, journalist
Olivia Ferrandi, journalist
Christian Authier, writer
Philippe Bélaval, civil servant
Jacques Cantier, historian
Henri Cuq, politician
Philippe Folliot, politician
François Fontan, politician
Jacques Godfrain, politician
Masri Feki, writer

References

University of Toulouse
Toulouse
Universities and colleges in Toulouse
Educational institutions established in 1948
1948 establishments in France